Acer sinense is a species of flowering plant in the maple genus Acer, native to southeast and south-central China. A small (typically 3 to 5m tall) tree rarely reaching 15m, it prefers to grow in forested valleys 500 to 2500m above sea level.

It is a highly morphologically variable species, leading to some taxonomic confusion. Some authorities consider it to be a subspecies of Campbell's maple, Acer campbellii subsp. sinense, but this is incorrect; it is in its own species complex. Good traits to distinguish it from members of the Acer wilsonii species complex are that its inflorescence is a compound corymbose panicle with 60 to 70 flowers, with pedicels that are 5 to 6 mm long, its ovaries are pilose, appearing white, and its nutlet is nearly glabrous, and convex, without any veins.

References

sinense
Trees of China
Endemic flora of China
Plants described in 1889